Fateh Ziadi (born ) is an Algerian sport shooter who competes in the men's 10 metre air pistol. At the 2012 Summer Olympics, he finished 43rd in the qualifying round, failing to make the cut for the final.

References

Living people
Olympic shooters of Algeria
Shooters at the 2012 Summer Olympics
People from Batna, Algeria
Algerian male sport shooters
21st-century Algerian people
1976 births